Lawrence Airport may refer to:

 Clearfield-Lawrence Airport in Clearfield, Pennsylvania, United States (FAA: FIG)
 Corry-Lawrence Airport in Corry, Pennsylvania, United States (FAA: 8G2)

See also 
 Lawrence County Airport (disambiguation)
 Lawrence Municipal Airport (disambiguation)